A list of Northern Ireland government departments, their agencies and their ministers and related organisations.
The devolved government of Northern Ireland (the Northern Ireland Executive) is responsible for most public services in the region but some services are also provided by the United Kingdom Government and cross-border bodies under the North/South Ministerial Council.  Public bodies take several forms with some reporting directly to their department (agencies) and others operating having more independence as they advise government (non-departmental public bodies).

Below the regional tier of public bodies, public services are also provided by 11 local authorities, one educational authority and five health and social care trusts.  Others are accountable directly to the Northern Ireland Assembly or to external organisations, like the European Union.

Ministers
Northern Ireland Executive

 First Minister
 deputy First Minister
Junior Ministers (accountable to the First Minister and deputy First Minister)
 Minister for Agriculture, Environment and Rural Affairs
 Minister for Communities
 Minister for Education
 Minister for Economy
 Minister for Finance
 Minister for Health
 Minister for Infrastructure
 Minister for Justice
United Kingdom Government

 Secretary of State for Northern Ireland
 Minister of State, Northern Ireland Office

Law officers
 Attorney General for Northern Ireland (advisor to the Northern Ireland Executive)
 Advocate General for Northern Ireland (advisor to the United Kingdom Government, also Attorney General for England and Wales)

Northern Ireland Executive agencies

The Executive Office
Commissioner for Public Appointments for Northern Ireland
Inquiry into Historical Institutional Abuse
North South Ministerial Council Joint Secretariat (North)
Non-Departmental Public Bodies:
Northern Ireland Commissioner for Children and Young People (only involved with appointment of commissioner)
Commissioner for Older People for Northern Ireland (only involved with appointment of the commissioner)
Community Relations Council for Northern Ireland
Commission for Victims and Survivors for Northern Ireland
Equality Commission for Northern Ireland
Maze/Long Kesh Development Corporation
Northern Ireland Judicial Appointments Commission
Strategic Investment Board
Victims and Survivors Service
Department of Agriculture, Environment and Rural Affairs (DAERA)
Advisory Bodies:
Council for Nature Conservation and the Countryside (CNCC)
Historic Buildings Council
Historic Monuments Council
College of Agriculture, Food and Rural Enterprise
Forest Service
Northern Ireland Environment Agency (NIEA)
Rivers Agency
Non-Departmental Public Bodies:
Agri-Food and Biosciences Institute
Agricultural Wages Board for Northern Ireland
Drainage Council for Northern Ireland
Livestock and Meat Commission for Northern Ireland
Local Government Staff Commission
Northern Ireland Fisheries Harbour Authority
Northern Ireland Local Government Officers' Superannuation Committee
Department for Communities (DfC)
Child Maintenance Service
Rent Assessment Panel
Public Record Office of Northern Ireland (PRONI)
Social Security Agency (SSA)
Non-Departmental Public Bodies:
Armagh Observatory and Armagh Planetarium
Arts Council of Northern Ireland
Charities Advisory Committee (non-executive)
Charity Commission for Northern Ireland
National Museums and Galleries of Northern Ireland
Northern Ireland Library Authority (Libraries NI)
Northern Ireland Museums Council Ltd
Northern Ireland Screen
Office of the Social Fund Commissioner (NI)
Sports Council for Northern Ireland
Vaughan's Charitable Trust (overseeing role only, no funding involved)
Public Corporation:
Northern Ireland Housing Executive
Department of Education (DE)
Further Education and Teacher Training Colleges:
Belfast Metropolitan College
Northern Regional College
North West Regional College
Southern Regional College
South Eastern Regional College
South West College
Stranmillis University College
St. Mary's University College
Non-Departmental Public Bodies:
Comhairle na Gaelscolaiochta
Council for Catholic Maintained Schools
Controlled Schools' Support Council
General Teaching Council for Northern Ireland
Education Authority
Middletown Centre for Autism
Northern Ireland Council for Integrated Education
Northern Ireland Council for the Curriculum, Examinations and Assessment
Staff Commission for Education and Library Boards
Youth Council for Northern Ireland
Tribunal:
Exceptional Circumstances Body
Department for the Economy (DfE)
Geological Survey of Northern Ireland
Non-Departmental Public Bodies:
CITB–ConstructionSkills Northern Ireland
General Consumer Council for Northern Ireland
Health and Safety Executive for Northern Ireland (HSENI)
Invest Northern Ireland
Labour Relations Agency
Northern Ireland Tourist Board (NITB)
Office of The Industrial Tribunals and The Fair Employment Tribunal
Public Corporation:
Harland and Wolff
Ulster Supported Employment Limited
Department of Finance (DoF)
Land and Property Services (LPS)
Northern Ireland Statistics and Research Agency (NISRA)
Non-Departmental Public Bodies:
Lay Observer for Northern Ireland
Northern Ireland Building Regulations Advisory Committee
Principal Civil Service Pension Scheme (Northern Ireland) Governance Group
Public Service Commission for Northern Ireland
Statistics Advisory Committee
Tribunal:
Northern Ireland Civil Service Appeals Board
Department of Health (DoH)
Health and Social Care Board
Belfast Health and Social Care Trust
Northern Health and Social Care Trust
South Eastern Health and Social Care Trust
Southern Health and Social Care Trust
Western Health and Social Care Trust
Public Health Agency
Safeguarding Board for Northern Ireland
Non-Departmental Public Bodies:
Business Services Organisation
Clinical and Excellence Awards Committee (non-executive)
Northern Ireland Ambulance Service Health and Social Care Trust
Northern Ireland Blood Transfusion Service
Northern Ireland Fire and Rescue Service
Northern Ireland Guardian ad Litem Agency
Northern Ireland Medical and Dental Training Agency
Northern Ireland Practice and Education Council for Nursing and Midwifery
Northern Ireland Social Care Council
Patient Client Council
Poisons Board (non-executive)
Regulation and Quality Improvement Authority
Tribunals:
Tribunal under Schedule 11 to the HPSS (NI) Order 1972 (meets on an ad-hoc basis)
Department for Infrastructure (DfI)
Driver and Vehicle Agency (DVA) (technically a public corporation)
Driver and Vehicle Testing Agency Trading Fund
Transport NI
Public Corporations:
Northern Ireland Transport Holding Company (trades as Translink)
Northern Ireland Water
Trust Ports:
Belfast Harbour Commissioners
Donaghadee Harbour Commissioners
Londonderry Port & Harbour Commissioners
Warrenpoint Harbour Authority
Department of Justice (DOJ)
Compensation Agency (Northern Ireland)
Forensic Science Northern Ireland
Northern Ireland Courts and Tribunals Service
Northern Ireland Prison Service
Northern Ireland Prisoner Ombudsman
Planning Appeals Commission and Water Appeals Commission
Youth Justice Agency of Northern Ireland
Non-Departmental Public Bodies:
Criminal Justice Inspection Northern Ireland
Northern Ireland Legal Services Commission
Northern Ireland Police Fund
Northern Ireland Policing Board
Northern Ireland Police Ombudsman
Police Rehabilitation and Retraining Trust
Futures NI
Police Service of Northern Ireland (PSNI)
Probation Board for Northern Ireland (PBNI)
RUC George Cross Foundation
Public Prosecution Service for Northern Ireland (PPSNI) Non-Ministerial Department

Local and sub-regional government

Local authorities
 

Antrim and Newtownabbey Borough Council
Armagh, Banbridge and Craigavon District Council
Belfast City Council
Causeway Coast and Glens District Council
Derry and Strabane District Council
Fermanagh and Omagh District Council
Lisburn and Castlereagh District Council
Mid and East Antrim District Council
Mid-Ulster District Council
Newry, Mourne and Down District Council
North Down and Ards District Council

UK Government
The following departments of the United Kingdom government and UK-wide public bodies operate in Northern Ireland.

Northern Ireland Office (NIO)

The NIO is the UK department responsible for Northern Ireland affairs and is led by the Secretary of State for Northern Ireland, who represents Northern Ireland interests at Cabinet level.  It is responsible for the following public bodies:
Electoral Office for Northern Ireland
Northern Ireland Human Rights Commission
Parades Commission

Executive agencies (by department)
Department for Business, Energy and Industrial Strategy (as of 14 July 2016)
Companies House
Home Office:
HM Passport Office
UK Visas and Immigration
Department for Transport:
Maritime and Coastguard Agency

Non-departmental public bodies (outside NIO, by department)

Department for Environment, Food and Rural Affairs:
Ministry of Justice:
Boundary Commission for Northern Ireland
Information Commissioner's Office

Non-ministerial departments (answerable to Parliament)
Food Standards Agency
HM Revenue and Customs

Other regulators
Bank of England
Electoral Commission
Office of Communications

Defence and security services
British Armed Forces (principally the British Army)
Security Service (MI5)

Public bodies operating from Great Britain

Several public bodies have a UK-wide remit for reserved and excepted matters in Northern Ireland but operate from Great Britain.

Department for Business, Energy and Industrial Strategy:
Competition Commission
Intellectual Property Office
Met Office
Research Councils UK
United Kingdom Atomic Energy Authority
Department for Culture, Media and Sport:
National Lottery Commission
Olympic Delivery Authority
Ministry of Defence:
United Kingdom Hydrographic Office
Department of Energy and Climate Change:
Nuclear Decommissioning Authority
Department for Environment, Food and Rural Affairs:
Rural Payments Agency
Sea Fish Industry Authority
Department of Health:
Human Fertilisation and Embryology Authority
Human Genetics Commission
Human Tissue Authority
Ministry of Justice
Information Tribunal
Department for Transport:
Air Accidents Investigation Branch
Civil Aviation Authority
Marine Accident Investigation Branch
Rail Accident Investigation Branch
HM Treasury:
Financial Services Authority
Royal Mint
Non-ministerial departments:
Central Office of Information
Crown Estate
Office of Fair Trading
Serious Fraud Office

North/South Ministerial Council
The North/South Ministerial Council (NSMC) consists of Northern Ireland Executive and Irish Government ministers, and is designed to encourage co-operation between the two jurisdictions on Ireland.  The similar British-Irish Council, which consists of ministers from all countries of the British Isles (also known as Britain and Ireland), has no related public bodies.

NSMC cross-border bodies:
Food Safety Promotion Board
Foyle, Carlingford and Irish Lights Commission
Loughs Agency
Lights Agency (proposed)
Institute of Public Health in Ireland
InterTradeIreland
North/South Language Body
Foras na Gaeilge
Tha Boord o Ulstèr-Scotch (Ulster-Scots Agency)
Special European Union Programmes Body (SEUPB)
Tourism Ireland
Waterways Ireland

External organisations

Independent Monitoring Commission (accountable to UK Government and Irish Government)
Irish Department of Foreign Affairs (through British-Irish Intergovernmental Conference joint secretariat)
United States Department of State (US Consulate-General, Belfast)

Other public bodies
Civic Forum for Northern Ireland (suspended)
Civil Service Commissioners for Northern Ireland
Northern Ireland Audit Office (NIAO)
Northern Ireland Authority for Utility Regulation
Northern Ireland Ombudsman

See also
Education in Northern Ireland
Health and Social Care in Northern Ireland
Local government in Northern Ireland
Northern Ireland Assembly
Northern Ireland Civil Service
Northern Ireland Executive
Northern Ireland Office
Reserved matters

References

External links
 NI Direct - Main Portal
 NI Direct - Contacts

Northern Ireland Executive
Government departments, their agencies and their ministers in Northern Ireland
Northern Ireland
Government